General Motors Local Area Network (GMLAN) is an application- and transport-layer protocol using Controller Area Network for lower layer services. It was standardized as SAE J2411 for use in OBD-II vehicle networks.

Transport-layer services
Transport-layer services include the transmission of multi-CAN-frame messages based on the ISO 15765-2 multi-frame messaging scheme. It was developed and is used primarily by General Motors for in-vehicle communication and diagnostics. GM's Tech2 uses the CANdi (Controller Area Network diagnostic interface) adapter to communicate over GMLAN.

Applications
Some software applications that allow interfacing to GMLAN are Intrepid Control Systems, Inc.'s Vehicle Spy 3; Vector's CANoe; Dearborn Group's Hercules, ETAS' ES-1222, ES590, ES715, and ES580; ScanTool.net's OBDLink MX; EControls by Enovation Controls' CANCapture; and GMLAN vehicle universal remote control GMRC for Android devices

References

General Motors
Serial buses